Better the Devil You Know is the third album by British pop star Sonia. It was released on the back of her entry into the 1993 Eurovision Song Contest with the title track.

Overview 
Released in May 1993, the album followed Sonia's appearance in the Eurovision Song Contest. The previous year, Sonia had been selected to be the UK representative and she performed all eight songs in the Song for Europe. The 1992 participant Michael Ball had enjoyed great success with his album based on the contest when it reached No.1 in the charts, and Sonia's management were keen to see similar results. "Better the Devil You Know" featured four songs from the contest (the top four placed songs: "A Little Love", "Our World", "So Much of Your Love" and the winner "Better the Devil You Know"). However, the album failed to replicate Ball's success and peaked at No.32 in the charts. The title track however finished a close second in the Contest and reached No.15 on the UK charts.

An earlier single, a cover of the disco hit "Boogie Nights" was also included on the album, while a planned follow-up to the Eurovision song, "Rescue Me" (also a cover) went unreleased. This album marked the end of Sonia's hit-making period, which had lasted since 1989. From this point, Sonia concentrated on TV and stage work, while two more singles and a final album failed to find success.

Track listing 
 "Better the Devil You Know" (Dean Collinson, Red) 2:38
 "Young Hearts Run Free" (Dave Crawford) 3:47
 "So Much of Your Love" (Patrick McGlynne, Jane Andrews) 3:43
 "A Little Love" (Phil Harding, Curnow, Imrie) 3:22
 "Our World" (Johnny Warman, Nick Graham) 2:47
 "Set Me on Fire" (Lisa Stansfield, Ian Devaney, Andy Morris) 4:10
 "Rescue Me" (Raynard Miner, Carl William Smith) 3:09
 "Boogie Nights" (Rod Temperton) 3:41
 "Not What I Call Love" (A. Parker, Sonia Evans) 4:08
 "My Light" (Mark Taylor, Tracy Ackerman, Sonia Evans)  3:56
 "Next to You" (A. Parker, Sonia Evans) 4:11
 "From Me to You" (A. Parker, Sonia Evans) 3:34
 "Just One Look" (Ian Levine, Pamela Sheyne)  3:31

Personnel 
 Nigel Wright - Producer on tracks 1, 2, 3, 4, 5, 6, 7
 Mark Taylor, Tracy Ackerman - Producers on tracks 8,10
 Mark Cyrus - Producer on tracks 9, 11, 12
 Ian Levine - Producer on track 13
 Phil Harding / Curnow - Mixers of track 8
 Pete Hammond - Mixer of track 13
 Robin Sellars - Engineer on tracks 1, 2, 3, 4, 5, 6, 7

References 

1993 albums
Arista Records albums
Sonia (singer) albums